The African Leaders' State of Africa Report offered a commentary on politics and policies from the perspective of the individuals shaping those trends. The Report was started in 2003. The goal was to provide a platform for political leaders in Africa to express their views about political developments in the region. The last issue is dated 2013.

References

2003 establishments in Massachusetts
2013 disestablishments in Massachusetts
Annual magazines published in the United States
Boston University
Defunct political magazines published in the United States
International relations journals
Magazines established in 2003
Magazines disestablished in 2013
Magazines published in Boston
Politics of Africa